Marty Montez Booker (born July 31, 1976) is an American former professional football player who was a wide receiver for eleven seasons in the National Football League (NFL). After playing college football for Louisiana-Monroe, he was selected by the Chicago Bears in the third round of the 1999 NFL Draft. During his first tenure with the Bears, he earned a Pro Bowl selection in 2002. He also played for the Miami Dolphins from 2004 to 2007, Bears in 2008, and Atlanta Falcons in 2009.

Early years
Marty Montez Booker was born July 31, 1976 to Vera and Calvin Booker of Jonesboro, La. Booker attended Jonesboro-Hodge High School in Jonesboro, Louisiana. He was a two-sport standout in both football and track. Following his senior season, he finished as the runner-up for the national Gatorade High School Player of the Year award. In track, he was ranked second in the state high jump finals as a senior. Booker also was a standout basketball player.

College career
Marty Booker attended the University of Louisiana-Monroe where he was a three-year starter. He finished his college career with 178 receptions for 2,784 yards (15.6 avg.) and 23 touchdowns. He ranks second in school history for career receptions.

Professional career

First stint with Bears
Booker was drafted in the third round (78th overall) in the 1999 NFL Draft by the Chicago Bears. He started four of the nine games in which he played during his rookie season, catching 19 passes for 219yd and three touchdowns. He did not play in each of the first six games of the season, with his first regular season action coming on an October 24 contest against the Tampa Bay Buccaneers. Booker's first career reception occurred on November 14 against the Minnesota Vikings, when he grabbed seven passes for 134yd and two touchdowns in what was also the first start of his career. He became the first Bears rookie to register a  receiving game since Willie Gault in 1983. Booker also combined with Marcus Robinson to become the 15th tandem in Bears history to record  receiving games in the same contest.

He was inactive for a September 17 game against the New York Giants with a shoulder injury. He had five catches for  against the Detroit Lions on September 24 - a game which began his streak of 82 straight games with a reception.

In 2001, Booker started all 16 games and set a Bears single-season reception record with 100, breaking the old mark of 93 set by Johnny Morris in 1964. That total also ranked second in the NFC and sixth in the NFL. On the season, he totaled 1,071 receiving yards, good for ninth in the NFC. He became just the seventh receiver (8th time) in Bears history to post a  receiving season. He collected a season-high nine receptions on five occasions, including each of the first two games. In a 31-3 win at the Atlanta Falcons on October 7, he had a  TD catch from Jim Miller and a  TD pass to Marcus Robinson.

He became the first Bears wide receiver to earn Pro Bowl status since Dick Gordon in 1972. Booker's reception total was second in team history, trailing only his 100 catches from 2001, while his yardage total was the fourth-best single-season figure. His reception total also was third in the NFC and tied for sixth in the NFL in 2002 while yardage figure was seventh in the NFC and ninth in the NFL. He amassed a career-high three  receiving games on the season, including the opener against the Minnesota Vikings on September 8 when he produced  - tied for the third highest single-game total in Bears history. His second  game of the season occurred against the Green Bay Packers on October 7, when he hauled in a career-high 12 passes - the fourth-highest single-game total in team history. Booker also threw a  touchdown pass to Marcus Robinson against the New England Patriots on November 10.

He was inactive for three games in October and November with an ankle injury. He compiled the seventh  receiving game of his career as he totaled  on five receptions, including a  TD catch, at Green Bay on December 7, when he tied Neal Anderson for fifth on Chicago’s all-time receiving list with 302.

He ranks fifth on the team’s all-time chart for receptions and sixth for receiving yards. His reception total was the most by any Bear in his first five years with the club while his yardage figure was third during this same time span.

On August 23, 2004, the Bears traded Booker and their third-round draft pick in 2005 to the Miami Dolphins in exchange for defensive end Adewale Ogunleye, who was coming off a career-high 15 sacks with the Dolphins in 2003. The following April, the Dolphins used the third-round draft choice acquired from the Bears on Florida linebacker Channing Crowder, who has since developed into a productive starter for the team.

Miami Dolphins
Booker started 15 games during his first season with the Dolphins in 2004. He finished third on the team with 50 receptions for 638 yards and a touchdown, behind fellow wide receiver Chris Chambers and tight end Randy McMichael. He had a reception in every game that he played for the fourth year in a row. Booker turned in his most productive receiving day of the season at the New England Patriots on October 10, when he hauled in seven passes for 123 yards. His entire receiving total from the game came in the second half as he became the first Dolphin to account for 100 yards receiving in a half since December 15, 2002 when Chris Chambers had 117 yards in the first half against the Oakland Raiders. Booker tossed a 48-yard completion to Chambers against the St. Louis Rams on October 24 for the third and longest completion of his career. That led to a Sammy Morris eight-yard touchdown run on the next play from scrimmage for the Dolphins’ first score of a game they went on to win, 31-14, as they earned their initial victory of the season. He was inactive for finale at the Baltimore Ravens on January 2, 2005 with an ankle injury.

In 2005, Booker started 12 of the 15 games in which he played, and was inactive for one contest. The three games he did not start occurred when Dolphins opened with two tight ends. He caught 39 passes for 686 yards and three touchdowns on the season. His reception total ranked third on the team, behind Chris Chambers and Randy McMichael while his yardage figure was second (behind only Chambers). Booker's average per catch of 17.6 was the best on the team among players with more than five receptions, and also marked a personal best. It also was the best figure by a Dolphin since 2002 when James McKnight put together an 18.2 mark. Booker accounted for a pair of 100-yard receiving games on the year, including the season opener against the Denver Broncos when he hauled in five passes for 104 yards. Included in that total was a 60-yard touchdown reception from quarterback Gus Frerotte - the second-longest pass play by the Dolphins in 2005. It was also Booker's fourth career catch of 60 yards or longer and his longest since he had a 61-yard touchdown catch on December 7, 2003 at Green Bay as a member of the Chicago Bears. He had five catches for 102 yards against the New England Patriots on November 13, marking the first time since 2002 that he had two or more 100-yard receiving games in the same season. He was held without a catch at Cleveland on November 20, snapping his streak of 82 straight games with a reception. Prior to that, the last time he did not have a catch was on September 10, 2000 at Tampa Bay as a member of the Chicago Bears. Booker had two receptions for 56 yards on December 18 against the New York Jets, including a 50-yard touchdown catch from Sage Rosenfels 4:05 into the fourth quarter, which broke a 17-17 tie as the Dolphins held on for a 24-20 victory. Booker hauled in a 15-yard touchdown pass from Gus Frerotte in fourth quarter of a January 1 contest against the New England Patriots, giving the Dolphins a 25-13 lead in their 28-26 victory.

In 2006, Booker finished first on the team in reception yardage and in touchdown receptions with 55 catches for 747 yards and six touchdowns. He had two other receptions for two-point conversions and also has three rushes for 19 yards. His receiving totals were his highest in all three categories since his 2002 season as a member of the Chicago Bears. In addition, his six touchdown receptions is tied for the second highest single season total of his career (along with his six TD catches in 2002 as a member of the Bears), surpassed only by his eight touchdown catches in 2001 with the Bears. Booker because a favorite target of quarterback Joey Harrington later in the season, with four touchdown catches in three games from Weeks 11 to 13. Booker started 14 games during the season and was inactive twice - on December 25 against the  New York Jets due to an ankle injury and on October 15 at the New York Jets due to a chest injury.

A projected starter in 2007, it was reported on April 26 that Booker was on the trade bloc.

However, Booker remained with the Dolphins as their No. 2 receiver behind Chris Chambers, with the team trying to work rookie first round pick Ted Ginn Jr. and Derek Hagan more into the offense.

Following a disastrous start to the season for the Dolphins, Chris Chambers was traded on October 16 to the Chargers for their second round draft pick in 2008.  Booker then became the only experienced receiver for rookie QB John Beck and career back-up Cleo Lemon to throw to for the rest of the season.

During the following offseason on February 11, 2008, Booker was one of nine players released by the Dolphins.

Chicago Bears (second stint)
On March 4, 2008, Booker agreed to a two-year contract with the Chicago Bears worth $3.5 million. He caught only 14 passes for 211 yards and 2 touchdowns, including a 51-yard touchdown reception. Booker was released by the Bears on February 13, 2009.

Atlanta Falcons
Booker signed with the Atlanta Falcons on August 6, 2009, after the team waived undrafted rookie wide receiver Bradon Godfrey.  Booker became an unrestricted free agent at the end of the 2009 season.

NFL career statistics

References

External links
Chicago Bears bio

1976 births
Living people
American football wide receivers
Atlanta Falcons players
Chicago Bears players
Jonesboro-Hodge High School alumni
Louisiana–Monroe Warhawks football players
Miami Dolphins players
National Conference Pro Bowl players
People from Jefferson Parish, Louisiana
People from Jonesboro, Louisiana
Players of American football from Louisiana